The Camden Water Battery is a series of defenses established along the banks of the Ouachita River in Camden, Arkansas during the American Civil War.  These defenses, little more than a series of rifle pits, were built during the fall of 1864, and were designed to address a weakness in Camden's defense that had been observed by both Confederate and Union forces during the failed Camden Expedition, an effort by Union forces to reach Shreveport, Louisiana from Little Rock.  The defenses are believed to have been built by Texas troops stationed there after the withdrawal of Union forces.

The defenses were listed on the National Register of Historic Places in 2007.

See also
Fort Lookout
Fort Southerland
National Register of Historic Places listings in Ouachita County, Arkansas

References

Military facilities on the National Register of Historic Places in Arkansas
Military installations established in 1864
Buildings and structures in Camden, Arkansas
National Register of Historic Places in Ouachita County, Arkansas
American Civil War on the National Register of Historic Places
1864 establishments in Arkansas
American Civil War sites in Arkansas
Ouachita River